The 2009–10 Mid-American Conference women's basketball season began with practices in October 2009, followed by the start of the 2009–10 NCAA Division I women's basketball season in November. Conference play began in January 2010 and concluded in March 2010. Bowling Green won the regular season title with a record of 14–2 by two games over Toledo and Kent State. Lauren Prochaska of Bowling Green was named MAC player of the year.

Top seeded Bowling Green won the MAC tournament over second seeded Toledo. Lauren Prochaska of Bowling Green was the tournament MVP. Bowling Green lost to Michigan State in the first round of the NCAA tournament. Toledo, Eastern Michigan, Kent State, and Akron played in the WNIT.

Preseason awards
The preseason poll was announced by the league office on October 28, 2009.

Preseason women's basketball poll
(First place votes in parenthesis)

East Division
  (22)
  (12)
  (2)
 
 Ohio

West Division
  (18)
  (14)
  (4)

Tournament champs
Bowling Green

Honors

Postseason

Mid–American tournament

NCAA tournament

Women's National Invitational Tournament

Postseason awards

Coach of the Year: Jodi Kest, Akron
Player of the Year: Lauren Prochaska, Bowling Green
Freshman of the Year: Courtney Osborn, Miami
Defensive Player of the Year: Kourtney Brown, Buffalo
Sixth Man of the Year: Rachel Tecca, Akron

Honors

See also
2009–10 Mid-American Conference men's basketball season

References